The 2009 Larry H. Miller Dealerships Utah Grand Prix presented by the Grand and Little America Hotels was the fourth round of the 2009 American Le Mans Series season.  It took place at the Miller Motorsports Park, Utah on May 17, 2009.  The race featured the debut of a new category of vehicles for the American Le Mans Series known as the ALMS Challenge, featuring Porsche 997 GT3 Cup cars from the IMSA GT3 Cup Challenge.

Report

Qualifying

Qualifying result
Pole position winners in each class are marked in bold.

Race
The team of de Ferran Motorsport won their second straight ALMS race at the track where the team made their debut in 2008.  Lowe's Fernández Racing continued their sweep of the LMP2 category with another victory, but led the #20 Dyson Racing entry across the finish line by less than six tenths of a second.  Flying Lizard Motorsports also continued their winning ways with their third straight victory on the season, leading the fellow Porsche of Farnbacher-Loles.  The partnership of Martin and Melanie Snow won the inaugural ALMS Challenge race, thanks in part to the disqualification of the two Orbit Racing entries for an illegal ride height.

Race result
Class winners in bold. Cars failing to complete 70% of winner's distance marked as Not Classified (NC).

References

Utah
Utah Grand Prix